Vaso Komnenić (born 15 May 1955 in Kosovska Mitrovica), is a retired Serbian and Yugoslav high jumper.

He represented Yugoslavia at the 1980 Summer Olympics and won 6th place in high jump. He was a member of Red Start athletics club.

References
 Sports Reference

Living people
1955 births
Sportspeople from Mitrovica, Kosovo
Serbian male high jumpers
Yugoslav male high jumpers
Olympic athletes of Yugoslavia
Athletes (track and field) at the 1980 Summer Olympics
Kosovo Serbs